Dernau is a municipality in the district of Ahrweiler, in Rhineland-Palatinate, Germany.

The village of Dernau which is centrally located in the Ahr valley is famous for its wines. Most of them are red wines. Besides agriculture, tourism is a strong economic factor.

References

External links

Populated places in Ahrweiler (district)